Frederick Seymour Gibbs (March 22, 1845 Seneca Falls, Seneca County, New York – September 21, 1903 Asbury Park, Monmouth County, New Jersey) was an American politician from New York.

Life and career
Gibbs attended the public schools. He fought in the American Civil War with the 148th New York Volunteers, and finished the war as a brevet first lieutenant. He then became a clerk with the Gould Pump Company, in Seneca Falls, and later was the Metropolitan representative of the company in New York City. On June 20, 1867, he married Caroline A. Mynderse.

Gibbs was a member of the New York State Senate (8th D.) in 1884 and 1885. In 1884, he was the Republican candidate for Mayor of New York City, but came in third behind William R. Grace (County and Irving Hall Dem.) and Hugh J. Grant (Tammany Dem.). he was a member of the New York State Assembly (New York Co., 13th D.) in 1889 and 1890.

On September 5, 1895, he married Daisy M. Meade. He was a member of the Republican National Committee from 1896 until his death; and was President of the Metropolitan Water Company.

Gibbs died on September 21, 1903, from "aneurism of the heart", and was buried at the Green-Wood Cemetery in Brooklyn.

References
 The New York Red Book compiled by Edgar L. Murlin (published by James B. Lyon, Albany NY, 1897; pg. 403 and 507f)
 Biographical sketches of the Members of the Legislature in The Evening Journal Almanac (1885) [e-book]
 Fourth Annual Record of Assemblymen and Senators from the City of New York in the State Legislature published by the City Reform Club (1889; pg. 52f)
 FREDERICK S. GIBBS DEAD in NYT on September 22, 1903

External links
"Catalogue of modern paintings: the private collection formed by the late Frederick S. Gibbs", a full-text auction catalog from The Metropolitan Museum of Art Libraries

1845 births
1903 deaths
Republican Party New York (state) state senators
Politicians from New York City
Republican Party members of the New York State Assembly
People from Seneca Falls, New York
Burials at Green-Wood Cemetery
19th-century American politicians